St. George's Independent School was founded in 1959 and now has campuses in Collierville, Germantown, and Memphis, Tennessee.

History
The school started in 1959 as an Episcopal church day school, serving the Memphis suburb of Germantown. Due to its success, parents took an interest in adding a middle school and, ultimately, a high school. Through a number of grants from donors and a partnership with Holy Trinity Episcopal Church, St. George's opened another elementary school in 2001 in an under-served section of Memphis, intending to model how an independent school could contribute to community transformation. In 2002, St. George's received a donation of land in the eastern Memphis suburb of Collierville, where the school opened a middle and upper school campus. Now, more than 60 years later, the school is a city-spanning network of three campuses with sprawling facilities, an exceptional faculty, and nearly 1,100 students from 45 zip codes. The original elementary school still operates in Germantown and now also includes Little Georgies Infant and Early Learning program for age six weeks to three years.

The Germantown Campus (located at 8250 Poplar Avenue Germantown, Tennessee 38138) was built in 1959, and is the oldest of the three campuses. It serves grades pre-kindergarten through fifth grade.

The Memphis Campus (located at 3749 Kimball Avenue Memphis, Tennessee 38111) was the next to be founded, in 2001. It serves grades prekindergarten through fifth grade.

The Collierville Campus (located at 1880 Wolf River Blvd. Collierville, Tennessee 38017) was founded in 2002, and serves grades six through 12. The Collierville Campus has two wings, dividing the school into middle school (grades 6–8) and upper school (grades 9–12).

Academics

Academics at the Collierville campus follow a traditional high school curriculum and the graduation requirements  are as follows:

English: 4 units (8 semesters)
History/Social Sciences: 3 units (6 semesters)
Laboratory Science: 3 units (6 semesters)
Mathematics: 4 units (8 semesters)
Language: 3 units (6 semesters)
Arts: 1 (2 semesters)
Religion 1 (2 semesters)
Specialized Independent Study(see section below): 1 (2 semesters)
Electives: 3.5 (7 semesters)
MINIMUM TO GRADUATE: 24 units (48 semesters)

Athletics
St. George's competes in the Division II-A (71 Teams 6th-12th grade), West Region A of the Tennessee Secondary School Athletic Association (TSSAA).

References

Educational institutions established in 1959
Schools in Shelby County, Tennessee
Schools in Memphis, Tennessee
Private K-12 schools in Tennessee
Preparatory schools in Tennessee
Collierville, Tennessee
Germantown, Tennessee
1959 establishments in Tennessee